Sohanlal (സോഹൻലാൽ) is an Indian film director and writer, based in Kerala.

Career
Sohanlal started his career as a production assistant and script writer with Doordarshan in 1996–2000 and later worked with the television channels - Indiavision in 2000-2002, Middle East Television in 2002-2004, Jeevan TV in 2004 and Amrita TV in 2004-2011 as Director-Programs.

Director

Sohanlal's first notable work was the 2006 TV film Neermaathalathinte pookkal adapted from a short story by Malayalam writer Madhavikutty / Kamala Surayya. The film was telecast on Amrita TV and received positive reviews and several awards including Kerala State Film Awards for Best TV Film, Director, Script Writer, Music and Audiography.

Sohanlal's first feature film was Orkkuka Vallappozhum in 2009 starred mainstream Malayalam actors. It won him the Kerala Film Critics Association Award for Best Debut Director and the movie screened in various film festivals worldwide. His second movie Kadhaveedu (House of Stories) was released in November 2013. His third movie The Great Indian Road Movie  was released in May 2019. His fourth movie is Appuvinte Sathyanweshanamand the latest film he directed is in 2022, Swapnangal Pookkunna Kaadu which is also the last part of his childrens film trilogy.     

Sohanlal is the director of the first childrens film trilogy in Malayalam. He is also a lyricist advertisement film maker and Event Director.

Lyrics written 
 2022 Swapnangal Pookkunna Kaadu
 2014 Konthayum Poonoolum
 2013 Kadhaveedu 
 2013 Teens
 2012 Mazhanritham
 2009 Thaalolam

Filmography - Director

References

 Road to dream realisation
 Two sides of the stray dog menace
 melange of a movie
 Abstract and like a haiku

Sohanlal to helm Mollywood’s first children’s film trilogy

External links
 
 

Living people
Film directors from Thiruvananthapuram
21st-century Indian film directors
Indian documentary filmmakers
Indian television producers
Malayalam film directors
Malayalam screenwriters
Malayalam-language writers
Malayalam novelists
Screenwriters from Thiruvananthapuram
Novelists from Kerala
Year of birth missing (living people)